= Syed Hamid railway station =

Railway station in Pakistan

Sayid Hamid railway station

General information
- Owner: Ministry of Railways

Other information
- Station code: SYD

History
- Former names: Great Indian Peninsula Railway
Location

Sayid Hamid railway station (Urdu: سید حامد ریلوے اسٹیشن) is located in Balochistan, Pakistan.

== See also ==
- List of railway stations in Pakistan
- Pakistan Railways
